Masku is a municipality of Finland. It is located in the province of Western Finland and is part of the Southwest Finland region. The municipality, which is located about  just north of Turku, has a population of 
which 
is water. The population density is
.

The municipality is unilingually Finnish. The municipality has also been known as "Masko" in Swedish. The Swedish name no longer has official status, and is considered outdated according to the Institute for the Languages of Finland.

On January 1, 2009 the municipalities of Askainen and Lemu were consolidated with Masku.

History 

Masku is one of the oldest parishes in Finland, having been established in the 13th century. It included Merimasku until 1577, when it was transferred to Naantali. The people of Masku also once held hunting grounds in the Turku archipelago, as evidenced by the toponym Maskinnamo (originally *Maskun Innanmaa) in Korpo. There is also a village called Maskulainen in both Rymättylä and Lemu, suggesting that the first settlers of those villages came from Masku.

Lemu and Askainen were consolidated with Masku in 2009. Masku adopted Askainen's coat of arms after the merger.

Notable people
The most famous resident of Masku is Finnish tennis player Jarkko Nieminen. Well known football players from Masku include Kasper Hämäläinen, Riku Riski and Roope Riski. Baron C. G. E. Mannerheim, field marshal and 6th President of Finland was born in Louhisaari Manor of Askainen in 1867.

Gallery

See also
Hemminki of Masku
Stenberga Castle

References

External links

Municipality of Masku – Official website 

Populated coastal places in Finland
Municipalities of Southwest Finland